Rostam Ghasemi (5 May 1964 – 8 December 2022) was an Iranian military officer and conservative politician who was the Minister of Roads and Urban Development from 25 August 2021 to 22 November 2022. He was Minister of Petroleum from 3 August 2011 to 15 August 2013.

Early life and education
Ghasemi was born on 5 May 1964 in Sargah village, Mohr County, Fars province. His father was a businessman and politician, and served as the governor of the Fars Province from 1980 to 1988. He graduated from Sharif University of Technology, studying civil engineering.

Career
Ghasemi joined the Islamic Revolutionary Guard Corps (IRGC) in Kharg Island in 1979. He participated in the Iran-Iraq War. After the war, he joined the Khatam-al Anbia troops in Bushehr, the Guards' engineering and construction company. In 1996, he was named head of the IRGC navy's Nouh base. Ghasemi became deputy commander of the troops in 2001.

He was the chair of the IRGC-affiliated Khatam-al Anbiya Construction Headquarters from 2007 to 2011. He retired from the military in August 2011.

On 26 July 2011, he was nominated as oil minister by Mahmoud Ahmadinejad to succeed Masoud Mir Kazemi. He was approved by the parliament on 3 August 2011, being the fourth oil minister in the Ahmedinejad government. He received 216 for votes of the 246 Majlis members. He was the president of the OPEC for 2011, despite being on the US, EU and Australian sanction list since 2010. Ghasemi's tenure as oil minister ended on 15 August 2013 and he was replaced by Bijan Namdar Zanganeh in the post. Shortly after leaving office Ghasemi was appointed advisor to Defense Minister Hossein Dehghan on 22 August.

Ghasemi was seen in a photograph dated 2011 in Malaysia cuddling a woman without hijab alleged to be his non-married girlfriend, in conflict with the laws of Islamic Republic of Iran's government during a time when he was the minister of oil, a cabinet position in that government.

On 8 December 2022, Ghasemi died of illness in China, aged 58.

References

1964 births
2022 deaths
Islamic Revolutionary Guard Corps brigadier generals
Oil ministers of Iran
Popular Front of Islamic Revolution Forces politicians
Islamic Revolutionary Guard Corps personnel of the Iran–Iraq War
Iranian individuals subject to the U.S. Department of the Treasury sanctions
Sharif University of Technology alumni
Quds Force personnel
People from Fars Province